The list of games for the TurboGrafx-16, known as the PC Engine outside North America, covers  commercial releases spanning the system's launch on October 10, 1987, until June 3, 1999. It is a home video game console created by NEC, released in Japan as the PC Engine in 1987 and North America as the TurboGrafx-16 in 1989.

Classification
Listed here are  games released commercially for the console between its launch on October 10, 1987, until June 3, 1999. This includes the TurboGrafx-16 in North America and the PC Engine in Japan. About 121 of those games are localized from the PC Engine library, 18 of those games are exclusive to the U.S. market, and the remainder are exclusive to Japan.

TurboGrafx-16 and PC Engine games were released in two types of storage formats, HuCards (also known as TurboChips) and CD-ROMs, with varying level of compatibility depending on the hardware configurations and options available. Specifically, there are two types of HuCard formats (the standard HuCards that comprised the majority of the PC Engine's library and a few games that are playable only on the PC Engine SuperGrafx) and three types of CD-ROM formats (CD-ROM², Super CD-ROM², and Arcade CD-ROM², each requiring the console to be equipped with a CD drive and the corresponding System Card if needed). There were also dual-compatible games that were designed to run in an older hardware specifications, but are programmed to take advantage of a newer one (such as reduced loading times). Out of the 389 games that were released on CD-ROM² formats, only 45 were released in North America. 213 games supported multiplayer options through the Turbotap, yet only 51 of these games were released in North America.

List of games

Other software

Non-game software and demodiscs

Unlicensed games
The following games were released without the approval of NEC nor TTI.

Notes

References

External links
PC Engine Software Bible – catalog of PC Engine games
PCECP – PC Engine Catalog Project – complete catalog of PC Engine games

TurboGrafx-16